Major-General Basil Charles Davey,  (21 November 1897 – 20 November 1959) commanded the group with principal responsibility for bridging the various major obstacles as part of Operation Market Garden and later became Commandant of the Royal Military College of Science.

Early life and career
Basil Davey was educated at Blundell's School in Tiverton, RMA in Woolwich and at Jesus College, Cambridge.

He was commissioned Second Lieutenant into the Royal Engineers on 26 August 1916 and saw active service with 1 Field Squadron during the First World War, where he was Mentioned in Dispatches.  He was promoted Lieutenant on 26 February 1918. After the war, in around 1920, he was posted to India with the 2nd Queen Victoria's Own Sappers and Miners. He was promoted captain on 24 September 1926.

In 1928, Captain Davey was posted to Catterick as Assistant Chief Royal Engineer (Asst-CRE). In October 1930 he was posted as an Instructor (Engineering) to the Royal Military College of Canada, in Ontario, until July 1934.  On return from Canada, Davey was posted to Chatham to take command of a Squadron Training Battalion, Chatham.  He was promoted to major on 16 July 1936 and qualified as an Interpreter (1st Class) and was posted to Rome.  In 1938, he returned to Catterick.

Second World War
At the start of the Second World War Davey was appointed Chief Royal Engineer of 6 Armoured Division and saw service in Algeria and Tunisia. He was promoted to substantive lieutenant colonel on 1 August 1942 and as acting-Brigadier was engaged on planning as Chief Engineer XXX Corps for the Allied Invasion of Sicily, under  Lt Gen Sir Oliver Leese, for which he was appointed a Commander of the Order of the British Empire on 23 March 1944 (the citation for which is available in The National Archive at Kew).

XXX Corps was subsequently called home to take part in the Normandy landings and Davey remained the Corps' Chief Engineer through Operation Overlord, the crossing of the Seine and Operation Market Garden. He returned to England in November 1944.

In early 1945 he was posted to Italy as Chief Engineer 8th Army and in May 1945 he became the Chief Engineer of the British Force that advanced into Austria. He was promoted to colonel on 1 Aug 1945 and was awarded the US Legion of Merit (Commander) at Schloß Schönbrun on 1 September 1946.

Post war

Davey returned to England in 1947 and the following year was appointed Commandant of the Royal School of Military Engineering. Promoted to brigadier on 29 November 1949, he was appointed a Commander Order of the Bath on 1 June 1951. He became Commandant of the Royal Military College of Science on 1 August 1951 and was promoted to the substantive rank of major general on 14 May 1952.

He retired from the Army on 20 September 1954 and lived in Jersey, where he was a Jurat of the Royal Court of Jersey.

Family
Davey married Enid Sanford Tudor Tudor, niece of both Admiral Sir Frederick Charles Tudor Tudor KCB KCMG and Admiral Henry Morton Tudor on 23 June 1926 at St Martin in the Fields, London. They had four children together, two of whom served in the Army; Anthony Davey served in the 1st The Royal Dragoons and Major Christopher Davey, noted Hot Air Balloonist and 2nd Royal Tank Regiment officer, whose children also serve. His grandson, Lt Col Dominic Davey commanded The Royal Dragoon Guards from Nov 2019 to Feb 2022 and his granddaughter, Lt Col Colette Davey is the Senior Medical Officer for 20th Armoured Brigade Combat Team.

References

Sources 
Obituary of Major-Gen. B.C. Davey, The Times, Monday, 23 November 1959 (pg. 16; Issue 54625; col C)
Royal Engineers Museum, Royal Engineers and Operation Market Garden (1944), Extracted 8 October 2009 
Generals of World War II

|-

1897 births
1959 deaths
Foreign recipients of the Legion of Merit
Jersey military personnel
Academic staff of the Royal Military College of Canada
People educated at Blundell's School
Alumni of Jesus College, Cambridge
Royal Engineers officers
Operation Market Garden
British Army major generals
British Army personnel of World War I
British Army personnel of World War II
Companions of the Order of the Bath
Commanders of the Order of the British Empire
Graduates of the Royal Military Academy, Woolwich
Judiciary of Jersey
Commanders of the Legion of Merit